The 212th Rescue Squadron (212 RQS) is a unit of the Alaska Air National Guard 176th Wing stationed at Joint Base Elmendorf-Richardson, Anchorage, Alaska.   The squadron has no assigned aircraft; personnel assigned use aircraft of the 210th and 211th Rescue Squadrons of the Wing.

Overview
Established on 8 October 2004 by the Air Force Special Operations Command as part of a re-organization of Air National Guard rescue units which created separate squadrons for fixed-wing, helicopter and pararescue elements of the 210th Rescue Squadron.

The HH-60 helicopter flight became 210th Rescue Squadron; the HC-130P Hercules flight become the 211th Rescue Squadron, and the pararescue flight became the 212th Rescue Squadron. The 212th also received additional manning and Combat Rescue Officers, which further increased its capabilities.

The squadron consists of pararescue and support personnel, using the HH-60 Pave Hawk helicopters of the 210th Rescue Squadron and the HC-130P Hercules transports of the 211th Rescue Squadron.  All three squadrons are assigned to the 176th Operations Group.

Stations
 Kulis Air National Guard Base, Alaska, 8 October 2004
 Joint Base Elmendorf–Richardson, Alaska, 18 February 2011 – present.

References

External links

Squadrons of the United States Air National Guard
Military units and formations in Alaska
212